The Maruti Suzuki Gypsy is a four-wheel-drive vehicle based on the long wheelbase Suzuki Jimny SJ40/410 series. It was being built at the Maruti Suzuki's Gurgaon, India plant since 1985. It was primarily built as an off-road vehicle and all models were built with selectable 4WD. It was extremely popular with Indian Armed Forces and Police & Law enforcement in India. Official production came to an end in 2018 due to tightening emissions and crash standards. However, Maruti has not dismantled the production line and is still producing the Gypsy in batches specifically for the Indian Armed forces. Maruti is also committed to providing spares and service owing to significant number of vehicles still in service with the Armed Forces and Law Enforcement.

History
Maruti Gypsy was introduced in the Indian market in December 1985 with the 970 cc F10A Suzuki engine and while sales were never very high it became very popular with law enforcement. It was codenamed MG410, which stood for "Maruti Gypsy 4-cylinder 1.0-litre engine". Initially, it was only available as a soft-top; but a bolt on hardtop was later introduced to the public after the aftermarket hardtops became popular. It instantly replaced Premier Padmini as the quintessential Indian rally car due to its performance, reliability, tunability and the go-anywhere capability. The carburetted F10A engine made  and was mated to a four-speed gearbox. The 4WD transfer case had two speeds. It had a freewheeling mechanism on the front axles made by Aisin to unlock the front axles from the hub when 4WD is not used; It reduced rolling resistance, thereby improving fuel efficiency. However, many owners of the Gypsy who constantly complained about the poor fuel consumption never knew about this novel feature.

The two major complaints of the vehicle in the civilian market were poor fuel consumption and poor ride quality especially in the rear seats. The suspension was indeed harsh with live axles and leaf springs all around. It features almost no creature comforts, like power-windows and power-assisted steering.

In July 1993, Maruti Suzuki introduced the "widetrack Gypsy" codenamed "MG410W" replacing the MG410. This is to mitigate an international allegation that Suzuki SUVs are very susceptible to rollover. Maruti eliminated the Aisin freewheeling hub on this model since it was sparingly used by MG410 owners. In April 1995, a catalytic converter was fitted to the Gypsys sold in the metro cities to comply with newly introduced emission standards.

In June 1996, Maruti Suzuki added the engine from the Esteem. The new engine was the all-aluminium eight-valve G13BA engine displacing 1.3L and made . This engine was carburetted unlike the US market G13BA engine. It was mated to a new five-speed gearbox. It was codenamed "MG413W" and called the "Gypsy King". The F10A-engined 4-speed MG410W continued in production as a base model until 2000. The visual differences of the Gypsy King compared to the MG410W are the pronounced bulge on the hood and a completely different grille design with horizontal slats à la the 1.3L Suzuki Jimny/Samurai JA51. Front seats received head restraints and fabric upholstery. 

The MPFI Gypsy King received a brake booster as well.

The Gypsy was exported to countries like Chile and Kenya. Within Europe, it is most often found in Malta. In contrast to Suzuki Jimny, the Gypsy is available either with four bucket seats or rear bench seats and a sizable trunk. Currently, the Gypsy is available as a "soft top", "hard top" and as an "ambulance car". In India, it is widely used by the police and military forces. In fact, the MG413W model is now the mainstay of the Indian Army. In civilian use, the Gypsy is a popular choice as a low-cost SUV and is a common sight at rally and autocross events.

As quoted by Autocar India, "There is nothing that can touch a Gypsy off the road, except perhaps an Arjun battle tank. The trouble is that everything else does better on the road - the ride from the archaic leaf springs all round is horribly bumpy and the interiors are utilitarian as well. Gypsy in a loaded condition (>200 kg load) is more comfortable. And available with only two doors, its inconvenient too." The price of a new Maruti Gypsy, if purchased in India, is US$11,250 (6,00,000 INR in 2012). As a 4x4 at this price point, its only Indian competitors are sold by Mahindra Thar and Force Gurkha. As of 2010, the Gypsy is only available against an order with an advance payment and a waiting period of over 3 months. This has led to the creation of a strong market for used Maruti Gypsys.

In addition to the above refurbished Gypsies retrofitted with Nissan or Isuzu diesel engines are also available in some parts of India, although this practice is still limited to unorganised market and there are some issues with RTO registration with retrofitted engines.
Production of the Maruti Gypsy for civilians stopped in March 2019. However Gypsy is still in production for defence. Bookings from civilians were taken till December 2018 and were delivered by March 2019.

New Zealand
In 2013 Suzuki New Zealand introduced the Gypsy King into New Zealand badged as the Suzuki Farm Worker 4x4. Although sold as a Suzuki, with Suzuki script badges on the bonnet and tailgate, the Maruti Suzuki logo badge can clearly be seen in the centre of the radiator grille. The Farm Worker is available in four slightly differing styles all based on the lwb softtop platform with a maximum payload of 500 kg: two having a rear window and fibreglass bulkhead, and two having canvas roofs with foldable front windscreens. No hardtop versions are available. As its name suggests, the Farm Worker is intended for farm work only and is not able to be road registered, and therefore not able to be driven on public roads, due to the vehicle not meeting current New Zealand crash protection regulations.

Suzuki New Zealand stopped listing the Farm Worker on their website in August 2016.

Technical data 

Maruti Suzuki MG413W "Gypsy King"

Dimensions
Front track 	
Rear track 	
Kerb weight 	985 kg/1, 040 kg*
Gross vehicle weight 	1585 kg/1,620 kg*

Engine
Type 	G13BB MPFI 16-valve gasoline
Cylinders 	4
Displacement 	1298 cc
Maximum power 	 @6000 rpm
Maximum torque 	 @ 4500 rpm
Transmission type 	Five forward (all synchromesh), one reverse
Transfer gearbox 	Two-speed
Type 	constant mesh
Transfer gear ratio 	High : 1.409; Low : 2.268
Suspension Front and rear leaf springs with double action dampers
	
Brakes 	with booster
Front 	Disc 250 mm
Rear 	Drum 220 mm
Tyres 	F78-15-4 PR 205/70R15

Capacities
Fuel tank 	
Engine oil

References

External links
 Archived Maruti Suzuki Gypsy official website

 

Gypsy
OEM Suzuki vehicles
Off-road vehicles
Cars introduced in 1985
Cars discontinued in 2018